GTBT  is the second studio album by Japanese pop-rock band Chicago Poodle. It was released on 6 October 2010 by Giza Studio label.

Background
GTBT literally means "Good Times Bad Times".

The album consists of three previously released singles, such as Ai to Shaberu Kotoba (Mono), Fly ~Kaze ga Fukinuketeiku~ and Is This LOVE?. The single Ai to Shaberu Kotoba is the first self-arranged song by the vocalist and composer Kouta Hanazawa.

Charting
The album reached #54 rank in Oricon for first week and sold 1,777 copies. It charted for 2 weeks and sold 2,334 copies.

Track listing
All the songs has been arranged by Chicago Poodle (except of #5, by Kouta Hanazawa)

Usage in media
Is this LOVE? was used as ending theme for Nihon TV program Himitsu no Kenmin Show
Fly ~Kaze ga Fukinuketeiku~ was used as theme song for Asahi Broadcasting Corporation program Kazoku Lesson

References 

Giza Studio albums
Being Inc. albums
Japanese-language albums
2010 albums
Chicago Poodle albums